Ladakh Union Territory Front (LUTF) was formed in 2002 as a conglomerate of political parties in Ladakh in India.

Objective
Its basic objective was to fight for the Union Territory status for Ladakh. A consortium of political parties formed in 2002 decided that a regional party shall be formed under a single flag and carry the struggle for the Union territory status for Ladakh. Things changed when few of the nominated candidates shifted sides and joined Indian National Congress (INC). Since then a kind of bipartisan politics begun in Ladakh between the LUTF and the Indian National Congress.

Merger
In 2010, when the elections for LAHDC, Leh, was round the corner, LUTF merged into Bharatiya Janata Party (BJP). Subsequently, the BJP won 4 out of 26 seats on the council in this election.

Fulfillment of demand
In August 2019, the Parliament of India passed an act by which Ladakh became a union territory on 31 October 2019.

Support from Gilgit Baltistan

Gilgit-Baltistan activist Senge H Sering supported Ladakh as separate Union Territory.

See also
Ladakh
Politics of Ladakh
Ladakh Autonomous Hill Development Council, Leh
Ladakh Autonomous Hill Development Council, Kargil
Ladakh Buddhist Association

References

2002 establishments in Jammu and Kashmir
2010 disestablishments in India
Bharatiya Janata Party
Defunct political parties in India
Former member parties of the National Democratic Alliance
Organisations based in Ladakh
Political parties disestablished in 2010
Political parties established in 2002